Chicago Rose of Tralee 
is a part of the Irish international competition Rose of Tralee (festival) in which one young woman, of Irish ancestry, is crowned the Chicago Rose of Tralee. The winner of the Chicago Rose of Tralee is based on personality, integrity, intellect and whether or not they would be a good role model and representative of Irish heritage and culture. This Chicago event is held each March at the Irish American Heritage Center and has been previously held at the Beverly Arts Center.

History
The Rose of Tralee International Festival originated in Tralee, County Kerry and was based on the love song The Rose of Tralee, by William Mulchinock. The festival began in 1959 and is now an important international competition. There have been two previous winners of the Rose of Tralee to come from Chicago, Theresa Kenny in 1960 and Larna Canoy in 1987.

Although Chicago has long held a strong Irish presence, the Chicago Rose of Tralee has only recently been reinstated as it had been an inactive city for some time. In 2008, the Chicago Rose of Tralee returned to Chicago with the crowning of Shaylin McNamara as the Chicago Rose of Tralee. Since the Chicago Rose of Tralee's reinstatement, three Chicago Roses have gone on to compete in The Rose of Tralee International Festival Finals in Tralee, Co. Kerry, those Chicago Roses include: Siobhan Carroll in 2011, Margaret Rose Keating in 2012, and Maeve McSweeney in 2015.

Responsibilities
Once crowned the Chicago Rose of Tralee, the winning Rose will travel to Portlaoise, Ireland to compete for an American Regional spot. As of 2012, there will be 16 Roses from across the U.S. that will compete for 9 regional spots. Roses from Ireland, Britain, Canada, Germany, Dubai and Luxembourg will also be competing for regional spots during this week-long festival in Portlaoise. Once a Rose qualifies at the Regional Selection, they will return to Ireland for the final Rose of Tralee selection in August in Tralee, in County Kerry, Ireland in hopes of being crowned the International Rose of Tralee during the events live televised broadcast.

During the Chicago Rose's one-year reign, the Rose is considered an ambassador for Chicago, connecting the global Irish community and sharing the heritage of Irish people at home and abroad. The Rose and the Chicago Rose Center spend much of their time volunteering in the Irish community at various Irish community events, dinners, and Irish festivals. There are also opportunities for younger girls to take part in the Rose of Tralee by taking part in Rosebud and Rosepetal activities.

The Chicago Rose of Tralee Centre is already taking applications for the 2015 Chicago Rose at www.chicagoroseoftralee.com.

Winners

References

External links
Official site – Dublin Rose of Tralee Centre
Official site – Philadelphia Rose of Tralee Centre
Official site – Ottawa Rose of Tralee Centre

Rose of Tralee
Annual events in Illinois
Irish-American culture in Chicago